Thomas Stegg (died 1652) was a Virginia merchant and politician. He was the first Speaker of the Virginia House of Burgesses in the 1643 session, when the Burgesses first met as a separate lower house of the Virginia General Assembly. He was the grandfather of William Byrd I through his daughter Grace Stegge Byrd.

Notes

References

1652 deaths
Speakers of the Virginia House of Burgesses
People from Charles City County, Virginia
Year of birth unknown